Woods Creek is a stream in Grundy and Mercer counties in the U.S. state of Missouri. It is a tributary of the Weldon River.

Woods Creek (also historically called "Wood Creek") most likely was named for the trees lining its banks.

See also
List of rivers of Missouri

References

Rivers of Grundy County, Missouri
Rivers of Mercer County, Missouri
Rivers of Missouri